Cicindela campestris, commonly called the green tiger beetle, is a widespread Eurasian species of tiger beetle. It is the type species of the large genus Cicindela.

Adult
The elytra and thorax are green, varying in tone from light to dark, spotted with cream-coloured patches, and in bright sunlight are somewhat iridescent. The eyes are blackish; the legs are brown with whitish hairs. The antennae are long and straight, not clubbed.

Behaviour
The adults are sun-loving. They live in places with dry soils (sandy or chalky), mostly between May and October at the latitude of Britain. Like other tiger beetles, they run fast on their long legs and are most often seen on bare ground, in Britain typically on heather moorland. They can fly fast, making a loud buzzing noise. It can run at speeds of 60 cm per second.

Distribution
Cicindela campestris is distributed across Europe from Spain in the southwest to Finland in the northeast. Most records are from the UK, Germany, Austria and the south of Sweden. In Britain, records are mainly from dry sandy or heathy areas such as the heathlands of Surrey, Hampshire and Dorset, and the mountains and moorlands of the Scottish Highlands.

Subspecies
The species is divided into several subspecies:
Cicindela campestris atlantis Mandl, 1944
Cicindela campestris balearica Sydow, 1934
Cicindela campestris cyprensis Hlisnikowsky, 1929
Cicindela campestris nigrita Dejean, 1825
Cicindela campestris olivieria Brullé, 1832
Cicindela campestris palustris Motschulsky, 1840
Cicindela campestris pontica Fischer von Waldheim, 1825
Cicindela campestris saphyrina Gené, 1836
Cicindela campestris siculorum Schilder, 1953
Cicindela campestris suffriani Loew, 1943
Cicindela campestris calabrica  Mandl, 1944

Ecology
The mollicute bacterium species Entomoplasma freundtii (Entomoplasmatales, Entomoplasmataceae) can be isolated from the green tiger beetle.

Notes

References
Chinery, Michael. Collins Complete Guide to British Insects. Collins, 2005.

External links
• Opus 43, Cicindela Campestris by Stephen Andrew Rawle.
ARKive
The Guardian: Country diary
The Linnean Collections

campestris
Beetles of Europe
Beetles described in 1758
Taxa named by Carl Linnaeus